Homoeotricha leporis is a species of tephritid or fruit flies in the genus Homoeotricha of the family Tephritidae.

Distribution
Kyrgyzstan, Kazakhstan.

References

Tephritinae
Insects described in 1993
Diptera of Asia